The current Governor of Kaliningrad Oblast is Anton Alikhanov, who succeeded Yevgeny Zinichev in 2016.

The EU and Russia have had a serious political debate over the oblast territory. The enlargement of the EU in 2004, through which Poland and Lithuania became member states, meant that the oblast now has land borders only with the EU. Issues of security have been at the forefront of debate, with high relevance to the Schengen Agreement.

Regionalism
After the collapse of the Soviet Union, some intellectuals and government officials in the oblast openly discussed the region separating from Russia. In the mid-1990s, Yuri Matochkin, the oblast's first post-Soviet governor, demanded a special relationship with the EU and threatened a referendum on secession, abetting fears in Moscow about the centrifugal forces of separatism. His attempts at elevating the oblast's status to that of a sovereign republic associated with the Russian Federation yielded no results. Around the same time, the secessionist Baltic Republican Party, banned in 2005, aimed at establishing the oblast as the "fourth Baltic state". However, an organized secessionist movement has never emerged there and surveys indicate strong support for remaining a part of Russia.

Social unrest in 2009-2010
From October 2009 to January 2010 several demonstrations took place in the oblast, initially against a significant increase with retroactive application of the tax on vehicles imported from the European Union, thus threatening local business. But after the second demonstration the demands extended to the resignation of Governor Georgy Boos and of the United Russia members of the regional council. Opposition parties and civic organizations like Solidarnost took part to these demonstrations. Although the first meeting on 24 October 2009 only gathered around 500 people, the second one on 12 December 2009 numbered 3 to 5,000 participants, the third one on 30 January 2010 from 10 to 12,000 people. Banners were deployed with slogans such as "Stop increasing the tariffs. We're against the government's antisocial policies and United Russia. It's Putin who's responsible", "Georgy [Boos] - we're ashamed that you're a biker [the slogan is being held up by bikers]/ United Russia has united against Russian citizens.", "You've overeaten, you've stolen too much, now it's time to serve your time", "Bring back governors' elections". Despite the first protest, the Kaliningrad regional Duma adopted a decision to raise the vehicle tax by an average of 25 percent, but rescinded on 28 January 2010. On 28 September 2010 governor Boos was replaced by the Russian Federation government by a new governor, Nikolay Tsukanov. The leader of the political coalition of the opposition, Konstantin Doroshok, a businessman mostly involved in importing cars, retreated from the movement on February 2. The local leader of the Movement "For fair elections", Andrei Nyrko, but also independent deputy Solomon Ginzburg, openly stated in interviews that Doroshok either had been bought or had been brought under pressure by the FSB. He was elected to the regional Duma at the 13 March 2011 elections as an independent candidate in a single seat constituency.

List of the Oblast's governors since the end of the Soviet Union
Yuri Matochkin  (appointed, September 1991 – 1996)
Leonid Gorbenko (elected, 1996 - November 2000)
Vladimir Yegorov (elected, November 2000 - 12 November 2005)
Georgy Boos (proposed by President Vladimir Putin to the Kaliningrad Oblast duma and approved soon after this, 12 November 2005 – 27 September 2010)
Nikolay Tsukanov (appointed, 27 September 2010 – 28 July 2016)
Yevgeny Zinichev (acting, 28 July 2016 - 6 October 2016)
Anton Alikhanov (acting, 6 October 2016 – 10 September 2017; elected 10 September 2017 -

Federal elections
At the 2011 legislative election, the Communist Party of the Russian Federation took 31% of the votes in the city of Kaliningrad and Putin's United Russia only 21%, but the results in the rest of oblast were favorable to United Russia. According to Igor Revin, regional deputy for the CPRF, the electoral process in the city was under severe scrutiny of observers, but in peripheric cities like Sovetsk the electoral rigging was extensive. According to Sergei Rybin, of the US-funded NGO Golos, "without rigging, the CPRF would have won the election in the whole region".

Constituencies 
 Kaliningrad constituency (No.97) 
 Central constituency (No.98)

Sources

See also
Kaliningrad Oblast Election, 2011